Hui Chak Bor (born 7 May 1968) is a Hong Kong former cyclist. He competed in the team time trial at the 1988 Summer Olympics. In 1998 he won a bronze medal at invitational competition in Taipei. By 2002, he had retired from international competition. He later became a manager for a Taiwan-based bicycle wheel rim manufacturing company.

References

1968 births
Living people
Hong Kong male cyclists
Olympic cyclists of Hong Kong
Cyclists at the 1988 Summer Olympics
Commonwealth Games competitors for Hong Kong
Cyclists at the 1986 Commonwealth Games
Cyclists at the 1990 Commonwealth Games
Cyclists at the 1994 Commonwealth Games
Place of birth missing (living people)
Cyclists at the 1986 Asian Games
Cyclists at the 1990 Asian Games
Cyclists at the 1994 Asian Games
Asian Games competitors for Hong Kong